Józef Baran-Bilewski (4 March 1899 – 15 April 1940) was a Polish athlete. He competed in the men's discus throw at the 1928 Summer Olympics. He was killed during World War II.

References

1899 births
1940 deaths
Athletes (track and field) at the 1928 Summer Olympics
Polish male discus throwers
Olympic athletes of Poland
Place of birth missing
Polish military personnel killed in World War II
Katyn massacre victims
Polish military personnel of World War II